Bertin may refer to:

People
 St. Bertin (c. 615–c. 709) was a saint and abbot of Saint-Omer
 Alexis Bertin (born 1980) is a professional footballer 
 Claude Bertin (died 1705) was a French sculptor
 Edouard François Bertin (1797–1871), son of Louis-François, was a French painter
 Françoise Bertin (born 1925), French actress
 Frantz Bertin aka Bertin (born 1983) is a Haitian footballer
 Guy Bertin (born 1954) is a former Grand Prix motorcycle road racer from France
 Henri Bertin (1720–1792), was a French minister of foreign affairs
 Jacques Bertin (1918–2010) was a French cartographer 
 Joanne Bertin (born 1953) is an American science fiction/fantasy novelist
 Jean Bertin (1917–1975) was a French scientist, engineer and inventor
 Kevin Bertin (born 1990), American drag queen known as Monét X Change
 Louise-Angélique Bertin (1805–1877), daughter of Louis-François, was a French composer and poet
 Louis-Émile Bertin (1840–1924) was a French naval engineer
 Louis-François Bertin (1766–1841) was a French journalist
 Louis-François Bertin de Vaux (1771–1842), brother of the above
 Manu Bertin (born 1963) is a French pioneer of the sport of kite surfing
 Marie-Jeanne Rose Bertin (1747–1813) was a French milliner and dressmaker to Queen Marie Antoinette
 René-Joseph-Hyacinthe Bertin (1757–1828) was a French anatomist known for his pioneering work in cardiology
 Ryan Bertin (born 1981) is an American amateur wrestler
 Teddy Bertin (born 1969) is a French footballer
 Théodore-Pierre Bertin (1751–1819) was a French author
 Willy Bertin (b. 1944), Italian ski mountaineer and biathlete
 Yvon Bertin (1953) is a former French professional road bicycle racer

Ships
 French cruiser Émile Bertin

See also
 Annals of St Bertin
 Abbey of Saint Bertin